Palaeotapirus is an invalid genus of tapir. 

Many primitive tapirs were originally classified under Palaeotapirus including members of Paratapirus and Plesiotapirus, but the original diagnostic material of the genus was too poor to characterize, leading to included species being moved to new genera.

References

Prehistoric tapirs